Dearborn/Van Buren was a station on the Chicago Transit Authority's Loop. The station was located at Dearborn Street and Van Buren Street in downtown Chicago. Dearborn/Van Buren opened on October 3, 1897, and closed in 1949. The closed station was severely damaged by an explosion in 1968, and the station houses were removed in 1971, the rest of the station was demolished in 1975.

The Harold Washington Library-State/Van Buren station now occupies the former Dearborn/Van Buren station area.

Image Gallery

References

Defunct Chicago "L" stations
Railway stations in the United States opened in 1897
Railway stations closed in 1949
1897 establishments in Illinois
1949 disestablishments in Illinois
Former North Shore Line stations
Buildings and structures demolished in 1975